Pam Yates (born 26 August 1981) is a former association football goalkeeper who represented New Zealand at international level.

Yates made her Football Ferns début in a 0–5 loss to United States on 3 October 2004, and finished her international career with three caps to her credit.

References

1981 births
Living people
New Zealand women's international footballers
New Zealand women's association footballers
Women's association football goalkeepers